Baumgärtel is a surname. Notable people with the surname include:

Bettina Baumgärtel (born 1957), German art historian
Elise Jenny Baumgartel (1892–1975), German Egyptologist 
Emil Baumgärtel (1885–1939), Austrian politician
Fabian Baumgärtel (born 1989), German footballer
Tilman Baumgärtel (born 1966), German author and journalist
Tilo Baumgärtel (born 1972), German painter